The Valuer-General of South Australia is an independent officer in charge of property valuations and oversees government property valuations and council rate valuation.

The Valuer-General provides valuation advice to all parts of the Government of South Australia as well as engaging with the private industry valuations. The Office of the Valuer-General (OVG) provides regulatory oversight of Land Services SA.

The position of Valuer-General was created by the Valuation of Land Act 1971, which sets out the role and responsibilities for the position as well as the OVG.

The incumbent Valuer-General is Katherine Bartolo as of January 2019.

References

External links 

 Official website

Government of South Australia
Government agencies of South Australia
Valuers general